The Sunbury Line (formerly known as Sunbury Subdivision) is a rail line owned and operated by Norfolk Southern Railway which in turn is owned by the Norfolk Southern Corporation. The line travels from Sunbury, Pennsylvania, to Binghamton, New York, connecting with Norfolk Southern's Southern Tier Line at Binghamton and Norfolk Southern's Buffalo Line at Sunbury. 

The rail line was once part of the former Delaware and Hudson Railway South Line that ran from Sunbury to Schenectady, New York. It is now an NS rail corridor consisting of the Sunbury Line and the Freight Line, which travels from Binghamton to Schenectady. 

The Sunbury Line's trackage consists of former trackage that belonged to the rail systems of the Pennsylvania Railroad and the Delaware, Lackawanna and Western Railroad. The Sunbury Line contains the Delaware, Lackawanna and Western's well-known Nicholson Cutoff railroad segment. The Tunkhannock Viaduct is one of the components of the Nicholson Cutoff/Sunbury Line.

History

1869-1976
The Sunbury Line is a former Pennsylvania Railroad property connecting its core system with the other anthracite rail lines in and around Wilkes-Barre, Pennsylvania; the line's Pennsylvania Railroad trackage was once the Wilkes-Barre Branch. The Sunbury Line is also a former Delaware, Lackawanna and Western Railroad property, as the Sunbury Line's Scranton, Pennsylvania, to Binghamton trackage was once part of the Delaware, Lackawanna and Western main line; this part of the Delaware, Lackawanna and Western main line which is now part of the Sunbury Line contains the Nicholson Cutoff and former Delaware, Lackawanna and Western Railroad trackage. The Delaware, Lackawanna and Western later merged with the Erie Railroad in 1960 to form the Erie Lackawanna Railway. 

The PRR Wilkes-Barre Branch ran from the downtown Wilkes-Barre rail cluster southwest to Sunbury along tracks on the east (left) shore of the North Branch Susquehanna River. The Danville, Hazelton and Wilkes-Barre Railroad opened from Sunbury to South Danville in 1869 and past Catawissa to Tomhicken in 1871. The North and West Branch Railway opened the line from Catawissa to Wilkes-Barre in the early 1880s, completing the line soon to be called Wilkes-Barre Branch. The line became part of the Pennsylvania Railroad and became known as the Wilkes-Barre Branch under PRR ownership. The PRR Wilkes-Barre Branch was passed to Penn Central in 1968, which was created by the merger between the PRR and the New York Central Railroad.

Today the former PRR Wilkes-Barre Branch from Wilkes-Barre to Hanover Township is owned by Luzerne County and operated by the Luzerne Susquehanna Railway. The remainder of the PRR Wilkes-Barre Branch that is now part of the Sunbury Line runs from Sunbury to Hanover Township, to what was the Buttonwood Yard of the PRR. There it connects with the former Wilkes-Barre Connecting Railroad; the Wilkes-Barre Connecting Railroad extended from Hanover Township to Hudson, Pennsylvania.

1976-Present
In 1976, the Pennsylvania Railroad Wilkes-Barre Branch and the Delaware Lackawanna and Western Railroad main line were taken over by Conrail due to Penn Central and the Erie Lackawanna Railway being absorbed into Conrail, with trackage rights assigned to the Delaware and Hudson Railway. The D&H acquired the majority of the PRR Wilkes-Barre Branch and the Scranton to Binghamton trackage of the Delaware, Lackawanna and Western main line (which contains the Nicholson Cutoff) in 1980, and combined it with part of its main line from Binghamton to Schenectady, New York, to form the new Delaware and Hudson South Line. The D&H main line continues in existence, now running from Schenectady to Montreal. The D&H was then acquired by the Guilford Rail System (now Norfolk Southern), a railroad owned by Guilford Transportation Industries (now CSX Corporation). Now a Guilford property, the D&H South Line was still a D&H property. The corporate structure was Guilford Transportation as the parent company, Guilford Rail as direct subsidiary and owner of the D&H and the D&H as indirect subsidiary. The D&H went bankrupt while owned by Guilford Transportation's Guilford Rail and, during the bankruptcy, the New York, Susquehanna and Western Railway ran its trains on the D&H South Line and the rest of the D&H. The New York, Susquehanna and Western was ordered to operate the D&H until a new buyer was found for the D&H.

The Canadian Pacific Railway then took over the D&H, but kept the D&H corporation in existence instead of absorbing it into the CPR. Canadian Pacific's takeover of the D&H included the D&H South Line, and Canadian Pacific then broke it into two new rail lines. The D&H South Line from Sunbury to Binghamton, made up of the PRR Wilkes-Barre Branch and Delaware, Lackawanna and Western main line trackage (which includes the Nicholson Cutoff) became the new Sunbury Line, and the D&H South Line from Binghamton to Schenectady, once part of the D&H main line, became its own individual line as well and was not added back to the D&H main line. 

The Sunbury Line was later renamed Sunbury Subdivision and in 2015, Norfolk Southern purchased the Sunbury Subdivision from Canadian Pacific in a direct transaction from the Delaware and Hudson and not from Canadian Pacific directly. After the purchase, Norfolk Southern renamed the line back to Sunbury Line. Norfolk Southern's purchase of the rail line took effect on September 19, 2015, and the purchase included the former D&H main line/D&H South Line from Binghamton to Schenectady. Norfolk Southern labeled this D&H trackage as its "Freight Line".

References

External links
 Norfolk Southern Railway

Norfolk Southern Railway lines
Pennsylvania Railroad lines
Rail infrastructure in Pennsylvania